The Pantesca salad or Pantelleria salad (Italian: insalata pantesca) is a typical dish of the island of Pantelleria.

It is prepared with boiled potatoes, tomatoes and red onions, seasoned with pitted olives, Pantelleria capers, oregano and olive oil. It is usually accompanied by mackerel in oil, but also by typical fresh cheeses such as tumma or boiled egg pieces. In ancient times, roasted dried fish was used instead of mackerel.

See also
 Italian cuisine
 List of salads
 Sicilian cuisine  
 List of Sicilian dishes

References

Salads
Cuisine of Sicily